Mimosa Helena Willamo (born 1994) is a Finnish Jussi-awarded actress. She was born into a bilingual family in Espoo, and has performed roles in both Finnish and Swedish languages. She is known for her roles in the films  (2014), Lake Bodom (2016),  (2016),  (2019) and Sisu (2022), among others. She was awarded Jussi Award for Best Supporting Actress for her role in Headfirst, and she won the Best Actress award in 2016 for her role in Lake Bodom at the Screamfest Horror Film Festival in Los Angeles. For her role in Lake Bodom, Willamo was also nominated Jussi Award for the Best Actress.

References

External links
 

1994 births
Living people
People from Espoo
Finnish actresses